Live in Wacken may refer to:

 Live in Wacken, a 2013 album by Bonfire
 Live in Wacken, a 2017 album by Unisonic